Stranger is a real-time strategy game by Russian studio Fireglow Games.

Reception
Stranger received its first review from Ace Gamez and achieved a score of 6 out of 10.

References

2007 video games
Real-time strategy video games
Video games developed in Russia
Windows games
Windows-only games
Empire Interactive games